Rajarsitulyakula was a royal house that controlled Dakshina Kosala in India. They were also known as the Sura dynasty and were succeeded by the Parvatadvarkas.

History
South Kosala had been in control of the Vakatakas for almost 60 years. After the death of Harishena, the last Vakataka king, South Kosala went into the hands of the regional Rajarsitulyakula. Their capital was located at Arang. The founder of the Rajarsitulyakula dynasty was Sura. This dynasty flourished in the 6th or 5th century.

The rulers used the Gupta Samvat or calendar, which shows that the rulers of this dynasty accepted the Gupta authority. 2 coins of the Gupta rulers have been found here, of Samudragupta and Kumaragupta I. Maharaja Bhimasena II issued the Arang copper plate inscription through which we get to know about the rulers of the dynasty. V. V. Mirashi identifies Bhimasena as the enemy of Skandavarman Nala. Skandavarman perhaps occupied their territory about 500 A.D.

The Rajarsitulyak was succeeded by the Parvatadvarkas.

List of rulers
The known Rajarsitulyakula rulers are- 
 Maharaja Sura
 Maharaja Dayita I alias Dayitavarman I
 Maharaja Bhimasena I
 Maharaja Dayitavarman II
 Maharaja Bhimasena II (c. 501 or 601–?)

References

Bibliography

History of Chhattisgarh
Dynasties of India